Baby Driver is a 2017 action film written and directed by Edgar Wright. It is jointly produced by Working Title Films and Big Talk Productions, with Sony and TriStar Pictures handling the commercial distribution of the film, and being financed through a co-production pact between TriStar and MRC and tax subsidies from the Georgia state government. Starring Ansel Elgort and Lily James, the film also features Kevin Spacey, Jon Hamm, Eiza González, Jamie Foxx and Jon Bernthal in supporting roles. Elgort plays the titular character, Baby, a getaway driver who seeks freedom from a life of crime with his girlfriend Debora.

Baby Driver premiered at the South by Southwest festival on March 11, 2017, and was released in North America and the United Kingdom on June 28. It was well received by the media for its craftsmanship and style, though the characterization and screenwriting drew occasional criticism. The National Board of Review selected Baby Driver as one of the top films of the year. It earned $226 million globally, bolstered by positive word-of-mouth support and flagging interest in blockbuster franchises, thereby becoming Wright's highest-grossing film to date. The TriStar–Media Rights Capital partnership recouped their budget with a $51.5 million net profit, factoring in marketing costs and other expenses.

Baby Driver was nominated for numerous awards, chiefly for writing and technical achievement, including three Academy Awards, two BAFTA Film Awards (with a win for Editing), two Critics' Choice Awards (again, with a win for Editing), and a Golden Globe Award. In addition, the film received five nominations for Empire Awards (winning two) and one nomination each at the Satellite, Saturn, Screen Actors Guild, NME (won), Grammy, MTV and Teen Choice awards, among others.

Accolades

References

External links 
 

Baby Driver